Aghaming is a community in the Canadian province of Manitoba.

The community is on the Wanipigow River near the point where it flows into Lake Winnipeg. Across the river is the Hollow Water First Nation. It is administered under the Northern Affairs Act of Manitoba.

Demographics 

References

 Aghaming, Manitoba
 

Designated places in Manitoba
Northern communities in Manitoba